Wong Ching-Po (born 1973) is a Hong Kong film director.

Filmography
 Fu bo (2003)
 Jiang Hu (2004)
 Mob Sister (2005)
 A Decade of Love (2008)
 Revenge: A Love Story  (2010)
 Let's Go! (2011)
 Once Upon a Time in Shanghai (2014)
 Pandora's Box 2021 (天目危机) (2021)

References

External links
 

1973 births
Hong Kong film directors
Living people